Peter Bohunický (born June 24, 1979) is a Slovak former professional ice hockey forward.

Bohunický played in the Czech Extraliga for HC Kladno, HC Karlovy Vary and HC Zlín, playing 45 regular season over three seasons. He also played in the Tipsport Liga for MHK Dubnica, HK Dukla Trenčín and MHC Martin and the Ligue Magnus for Diables Noirs de Tours and Ours de Villard-de-Lans.

Bohunický also played one season in the Ontario Hockey League with the Sault Ste. Marie Greyhounds who drafted him 24th overall in the 1997 CHL Import Draft.

References

External links

1979 births
Living people
ECH Chur players
Diables Noirs de Tours players
HK Dubnica players
HK Dukla Trenčín players
HC Karlovy Vary players
HC Kometa Brno players
MHC Martin players
Ours de Villard-de-Lans players
Rytíři Kladno players
Sault Ste. Marie Greyhounds players
HK 91 Senica players
Slovak ice hockey forwards
HC Slovan Ústečtí Lvi players
Hokej Šumperk 2003 players
PSG Berani Zlín players
Slovak expatriate ice hockey players in Canada
Slovak expatriate ice hockey players in the Czech Republic
Slovak expatriate ice hockey players in Switzerland
Expatriate ice hockey players in France
Slovak expatriate sportspeople in France